This is a list of Agencies under the United States Department of Defense (DoD) which was formerly and shortly known as the National Military Establishment. Its main responsibilities are to control the Armed Forces of the United States. The Department was established in 1947 and is currently divided into three major Departments—the Department of the Army, Navy and Air Force—and has a military staff of 1,418,542 (553,044 US Army; 329,304 US Navy; 202,786 US Marine Corps; 333,408 US Air Force). The DoD is headed by the Secretary of Defense. Currently, the DoD is led by defense secretary Lloyd Austin.

Department of Defense Agencies, Field Activities, and others
 Defense Advanced Research Projects Agency (DARPA)
 Defense Commissary Agency (DeCA)
 Defense Contract Audit Agency(DCAA)
 Defense Contract Management Agency (DCMA)
 Defense Counterintelligence and Security Agency (DCSA)
 Defense Finance and Accounting Service (DFAS)
 Defense Health Agency (DHA)
 Defense Human Resources Activity (DHRA) [Field Activity]
 Defense Information Systems Agency (DISA)
 Defense Intelligence Agency (DIA)
 Defense Legal Services Agency (DLSA)
 Defense Logistics Agency (DLA)
 Defense Media Activity (DMA) [Field Activity]
 Defense POW/MIA Accounting Agency (DPAA)
 Defense Security Cooperation Agency (DSCA)
 Defense Technical Information Center (DTIC) [Field Activity]
 Defense Technology Security Administration (DTSA) [Field Activity]
 Defense Threat Reduction Agency (DTRA)
 Department of Defense Education Activity (DOD EA) [Field Activity]
 Department of Defense Test Resource Management Center (DOD TRMC) [Field Activity]
 Missile Defense Agency (MDA)
 National Geospatial-Intelligence Agency (NGA)
 National Reconnaissance Office (NRO)
 National Security Agency/Central Security Service (NSA/CSS)
 Office of Local Defense Community Cooperation (OLDCC), formerly Office of Economic Adjustment (OEA) [Field Activity]
 Pentagon Force Protection Agency (PFPA)
 Washington Headquarters Services (WHS) [Field Activity]
Other DOD Components:
Armed Services Board of Contract Appeals
Army and Air Force Exchange Service
Defense Acquisition University (DAU)
Defense Criminal Investigative Service (DCIS) (component of DOD Office of Inspector General)
Joint Personnel Recovery Agency (a Chairman's Controlled Activity)
Military Postal Service Agency
National Assessment Group (NAG)
National Defense University (NDU)
National Guard Bureau (NGB)
Army National Guard (ARNG)
Air National Guard (ANG)
National Intelligence University (NIU) (part of DIA)
Organization of the Joint Chiefs of Staff (includes NDU)
Uniformed Services University of the Health Sciences (USUHS)
United States Court of Appeals for the Armed Forces
United States Military Entrance Processing Command (USMEPCOM)
Electromagnetic Spectrum Operations Cross Functional Team (EMSO CFT)
Close Combat Lethality Task Force (CCLTF)
Protecting Critical Technology Task Force (PCTTF)

Department of the Army
 U.S. Army Criminal Investigation Division (CID)
 U.S. Army Corps of Engineers
 Regional Headquarters
 Great Lakes Region
 Missouri River Regional Headquarters (CENWD-MR) (Former Missouri River Division)
 North Pacific Regional Headquarters (CENWD-NP)(Former North Pacific Division)
 Army Digitization Office (ADO)
 Army Medical Department (AMEDD)
 Army Research Laboratory (ARL)
 Army Review Boards Agency (ARBA)
 U.S. Army Financial Management
 White Sands Missile Range (WSMR)

Army Corps of Engineers: Divisions
 Great Lakes and Ohio River Division (CELRD)
 Mississippi Valley Division (CEMVD)
 North Atlantic Division (CENAD)
 Northwestern Division (CENWD)
 Pacific Ocean Division (CEPOD)
 South Atlantic Division (CESAD)
 South Pacific Division (CESPD)
 Southwestern Division (CESWD)

Army Corps of Engineers: Laboratories
 Cold Regions Research and Engineering Laboratory (CECRL)
 Construction Engineering Research Laboratory (CECER)
 Waterways Experiment Station (CEWES)
 Topographic Engineering Center (CETEC)

Department of the Navy

 Naval Criminal Investigative Service (NCIS)
 United States Marine Corps Criminal Investigation Division (USMC CID)

Navy
 Office of Naval Research (ONR)
 Naval Research Laboratory (NRL)
 Office of Naval Intelligence (ONI)
 United States Naval Academy
 Military Sealift Command (MSC)

Marine Corps
 Marine Expeditionary Units
 Commandant of the Marine Corps
 Assistant Commandant of the Marine Corps
 Sergeant Major of the Marine Corps
 Headquarters, United States Marine Corps

Department of the Air Force

Air Force
 Air Force Research Laboratory
 Air Force Reserve Officer Training Corps (AFROTC)
 Air Force Office of Special Investigations (AFOSI)

Major Commands (MAJCOMs)
Air Combat Command (ACC)
Pacific Air Forces (PACAF)
United States Air Forces in Europe (USAFE)
Air Force Special Operations Command (AFSOC)
Air Education and Training Command (AETC)
Air Mobility Command (AMC)
Air Force Global Strike Command (AFGSC)
Air Force Materiel Command (AFMC)
Air Force Reserve Command (AFRC)

Space Force
Field Commands
Space Operations Command (SpOC)
Space Systems Command (SSC)
Space Training and Readiness Command (STARCOM)

Unified Combatant Commands

The United States has eleven Combatant Commands (COCOM); seven Geographical Combatant Commands (GCC) & four Functional Combatant Commands (FCC).

GCCs:
 U.S. Africa Command (USAFRICOM)
 U.S. Central Command (USCENTCOM)
 U.S. European Command (USEUCOM)
 U.S. Indo-Pacific Command (USINDOPACOM)
 U.S. Northern Command (USNORTHCOM)
 U.S. Southern Command (USSOUTHCOM)
 U.S. Space Command (USSPACECOM)
FCCs:
 U.S. Cyber Command (USCYBERCOM)
 U.S. Special Operations Command (USSOCOM)
 U.S. Strategic Command (USSTRATCOM)
 U.S. Transportation Command (USTRANSCOM)

See also
 Combat support agency
 United States Department of Defense
 United States Unified Combatant Commands
 Fourth Estate (Department of Defense)

References

Most information on this list was taken from Government Information. Some pieces were taken from USA.gov.

It's important to note that the DOD does not directly control any federal agencies working domestically, for example the CIA is an intelligence agency that works on foreign territory.

Isaccdo, Poiymelo and Drtechnovoid are all code names for spies in the DOD's Elite intelligence departments.

Defense